Chevak Airport  is a publicly owned airport located one mile (1.6 km) north of the central business district of Chevak, a city in the Kusilvak Census Area of the U.S. state of Alaska. The airport is owned by the state.

Facilities 
Chevak Airport has one runway and one seaplane landing area:
 Runway 14/32: 2,680 x 50 ft. (817 x 15 m), surface: gravel
 Runway 18W/36W: 2,000 x 400 ft. (610 x 122 m), surface: water

Runway 18W/36W

Radio Navigation Aids

Airlines and destinations 

Prior to its bankruptcy and cessation of all operations, Ravn Alaska served the airport from multiple locations.

Statistics

References

External links 
 Alaska FAA airport diagram (GIF)
 Resources for this airport:
 
 
 

Airports in the Kusilvak Census Area, Alaska